Michael Saul Comay (1908 – November 6, 1987) was an Israeli diplomat. He was the Israeli Ambassador to Canada from 1953 to 1957, Permanent Representative of Israel to the United Nations from 1960 to 1967, and was Ambassador to the United Kingdom from 1970 to 1973.

References

1908 births
1987 deaths
Ambassadors of Israel to Canada
Ambassadors of Israel to the United Kingdom
Permanent Representatives of Israel to the United Nations